Rohit Kumar is an Indian professional Kabaddi player who plays for Gujarat Giants in the Pro Kabaddi League. He was the captain of Bengaluru Bulls which won the Pro Kabaddi League in Season 6. He is regarded as one of the best players of the game.  He was a part of the Indian contingent in the Asian Kabaddi championship 2017, 2018 squad for Kabaddi Masters Dubai and also in Asian games 2018

Pro Kabaddi League

Rohit's PKL Stats

Indian Kabaddi Team
Kumar was selected in the national squad for the 2016 South Asian Games held in Guwahati and Shillong.

References

Indian kabaddi players
Living people
Kabaddi players at the 2018 Asian Games
Medalists at the 2018 Asian Games
Asian Games bronze medalists for India
Asian Games medalists in kabaddi
South Asian Games gold medalists for India
South Asian Games medalists in kabaddi
Pro Kabaddi League players
Year of birth missing (living people)